Goodheart is an English surname. Notable people with the surname include:

Carol D. Goodheart, American psychologist
George Goodheart (1918–2008), American chiropractor
Steve Goodheart, American college baseball coach

See also
Goodheart–Willcox, an American book publishing company
Goodhart

English-language surnames